Victoria Rubadiri (born 28 January 1987) is a Kenyan journalist and TV anchor with Citizen TV in Kenya. In 2020, she won the 2020 BBC World News Komla Dumor Award. 

Rubadiri earned her bachelor's degree in Forestry from Masinde Muliro University and Arts Broadcast Journalism in 2003 at Temple University in Philadelphia, Pennsylvania.

Prior to being a TV anchor, she worked in Public relations and joined a lingala live band in New York State and as a radio presenter in Capital FM in Nairobi.

References 

Kenyan journalists
Kenyan radio journalists
Kenyan radio presenters
Kenyan women radio presenters
Kenyan women radio journalists
Kenyan women television journalists
Kenyan television journalists
Kenyan television presenters
Kenyan women television presenters
1987 births
Living people